Gilbert Henderson Harrington (born April 17, 1845 - died  June 22, 1897) was the main founder of the arms manufacturing firm of Harrington & Richardson.

Harrington was born at Shrewsbury, Massachusetts to Henry Henderson Harrington and Cornelia Bush Wesson. He moved with his family to Worcester, Massachusetts while he was still a child.

Harrington's uncle, Frank Wesson, started a firearms manufacturing firm in 1859. He began a brief partnership with Gilbert Harrington in 1871, as Wesson & Harrington, until Harrington bought him out in 1874.

1845 births
American manufacturing businesspeople
1897 deaths

19th-century American businesspeople